Christmas Eve is a 2015 American Christmas comedy film, directed by Mitch Davis, written by Davis and Tyler McKellar, and produced by Davis and Larry King. The film features a large ensemble cast led by Patrick Stewart, James Roday, Julianna Guill, Jon Heder, Cheryl Hines, and Gary Cole.

Set in New York City, the film tells the stories of various characters as they become trapped in six different elevators on the titular evening.

Cast 
 Patrick Stewart as Harris
 James Roday as B
 Julianna Guill as Ann
 Jon Heder as James Harris
 Cheryl Hines as Dawn
 Gary Cole as Dr. Roberts
 Christina Chong as Karen
 Max Casella as Randy
 Juliet Aubrey as Marta
 David Bamber as Walt
 Jenny Oaks Baker as Mandy
 Steve John Shepherd as Glen (as Steven John Shepherd)
 Lex Shrapnel as Tim
 Jaclyn Hales as Lila
 Clara Perez as Amelia

Reception 
Christmas Eve was panned by critics. On Metacritic, it holds a score of 24 out of 100, based on 4 critics, indicating "generally unfavorable reviews".

Joe Leydon of Variety wrote "Davis obviously aims to indicate a grand design to seemingly random events, and the presence of a higher power — probably God — capable of affecting human destinies." He further noted, "the movie can serve as undemanding home-screen amusement to enjoy while wrapping Christmas presents."

Jared Whitley of the Star Trek fan site Trek Movie gave the film "3 out of 4 lights," noting that "Patrick Stewart fans will no doubt remember his iconic role as Ebeneezer Scrooge in A Christmas Carol and will be happy to know that Stewart brings plenty of that regal Scrooge-ness to his role in Christmas Eve." He further noted that all the characters "have the kind of amazing cathartic experiences that can only happen in movies when you’re trapped in elevator with strangers."

The film was nominated for an AML Award.

See also
 List of Christmas films

References

External links 
 
 
 
 

2015 films
Films shot in Bulgaria
American Christmas comedy films
Films set in New York City
2010s Christmas comedy films
2015 comedy films
2010s English-language films
2010s American films